Rudolf "Rudi" Faßnacht (28 December 1934 in Neu-Ulm, Bavaria – 25 July 2000 in Gonesse) was a German football manager.

Faßnacht coached MSV Duisburg to a 7th-place finish in the 1970–71 Bundesliga season.

Faßnacht died along with his wife on board Air France Flight 4590, the Concorde which crashed in Gonesse, near Paris, on 25 July 2000.

See also 
 Air France Flight 4590

References

External links 
 
 

1934 births
2000 deaths
People from Neu-Ulm
Sportspeople from Swabia (Bavaria)
Victims of aviation accidents or incidents in France
German footballers
VfB Stuttgart players
SSV Ulm 1846 players
Hannover 96 players
Bayer 04 Leverkusen players
German football managers
Bundesliga managers
MSV Duisburg managers
Arminia Bielefeld managers
Tennis Borussia Berlin managers
SC Preußen Münster managers
SC Fortuna Köln managers
Association football defenders
Footballers from Bavaria
Victims of aviation accidents or incidents in 2000